North Linn Township is a township in Christian County, in the U.S. state of Missouri.

North Linn Township was named for the linden trees within its borders.

References

Townships in Missouri
Townships in Christian County, Missouri